A Santa Claus machine, named after the folkloric Santa Claus, is a hypothetical machine that is capable of creating any required object or structure out of any given material. It is most often referenced by futurists and science fiction writers when discussing hypothetical projects of enormous scale, such as a Dyson sphere. These types of future constructions would be too large for many civilizations to build directly, so they would need a series of machines to intelligently build the machine with little or no direct control.

Origin
The term was coined by Theodore Taylor in 1978:

It's possible to imagine a machine that could scoop up material – rocks from the Moon or rocks from asteroids – process them inside and produce just about any product: washing machines or teacups or automobiles or starships. Once such a machine exists it could gather sunlight and materials that it's sitting on, and produce on call whatever product anybody wants to name, as long as somebody knows how to make it and those instructions can be given to the machine.

Discussion
A mature Santa Claus machine requires significant advances in technology to be possible, including the ability to take any collection of matter and reconfigure it into any other type of matter.

Scientifically, it requires two parts: a disassembler and an assembler.

One form of disassembler would consist of an ionizing chamber, which heats the input matter to 43,000 °F (24,000 °C).  Once all the molecular bonds are broken and the electrons ripped off, each atomic nucleus would be moved through a magnetic field, where its path would curve in proportion to its charge/mass ratio, as per mass spectrometry. The separated ions would be captured by a linear array of cold traps to provide reservoirs of each element.

The assembler would use these reservoirs as input to some kind of additive layer manufacturing device (also known as 3D printers and rapid prototype machines).  Many of these printers are commercially available today—though currently few can print with more than one highly prepared material (much less an alphabet consisting of all the raw elements).

An autonomous Santa Claus machine would presumably require a high level of artificial intelligence, though for small projects, autonomous behavior is probably not necessary.  However, the "matter compiler" (that figures out which atom goes where) must be programmed appropriately—not a trivial task. A gigantic project such as a Dyson sphere would undoubtedly require not only autonomy, but also self-replication. These capabilities would enable a single Santa Claus machine, given sufficient matter and energy, to construct a project of any size.

See also
 3D printing
 Molecular assembler
 Replicator (Star Trek)
 Fusion torch

References

External links
 the Replicating Rapid-Prototyper Project : RepRap.org
 Don Lancaster's Santa Claus machine library
 Seth Rosenthal, Santa Claus Machine, Wired magazine, May 1994

Robotics concepts
Artificial life